Braemar Hill is a hill with a height of  south of Braemar Point on Hong Kong Island, Hong Kong. The hill was likely named after the Scottish village of Braemar by British officials.

Contrary to popular belief, the peak of Braemar Hill lies on the eastern end of Braemar Hill Road instead of the western end, where the ascent towards Red Incense Summit is noticeably steeper. Hikers often misidentify Red Incense Summit and nearby hilltops as the peak of Braemar Hill.

The north and western sides of this hill are largely residential, consisting primarily of private upmarket real estate. Because of its convenient location and high real estate prices, Braemar Hill is considered one of the more affluent neighbourhoods in the territory.

Infrastructure and establishments

Education 
The area is home to a large number of schools, including one-third of the secondary schools in Eastern District.

Primary schools
 Building Contractors' Association School
 Chinese International School
 Quarry Bay School
 SKH St. Michael's Primary School

Secondary schools

 Belilios Public School (government school)
 CCC Kwei Wah Shan Secondary School
 Cheung Chuk Shan College 
 Chinese International School
 Clementi Secondary School
 Concordia Lutheran School, North Point
 Kiangsu-Chekiang College
 Man Kiu Secondary School
 Pui Kiu Middle School
 St. Joan of Arc Secondary School 
 Tung Wah Group of Hospitals Lee Ching Dea Memorial College

Braemar Hill formerly had the Japanese International School, Hong Kong's junior high school section. In April 2018 the junior high school moved to the Happy Valley campus.

University
 Hong Kong Shue Yan University

Parks 
 Choi Sai Woo Park
 Tin Hau Temple Road Garden No. 2

Private housing developments
Tempo Court
Ho King View
Braemar Hill Mansions
Sky Horizon
Pacific Palisades
Kingsford Garden
Wilshire Towers
Braemar Heights
Maiden Court
Broadview Terrace
Evelyn Towers
Seaview Garden
Summit Court
Hilltop Mansion
Hanking Court
Coral Court
Sky Scraper
Flora Garden
Beverley Heights
Oxford Court
Viking Villas

Transport

Buses
23B to Park Road
25 to Central Piers (circular)
25A to Wan Chai Hong Kong Convention and Exhibition Centre New Wing (circular)
27 to North Point Ferry Pier
41A (special departure) from North Point Ferry Pier to Wah Fu Estate (via Braemar Hill)
81A from Hing Wah Estate to Lai Tak Tsuen (via Braemar Hill)
85 to Siu Sai Wan (Island Resort) (circular)
85A to Shau Kei Wan
85P to Island Resort
108 to Kowloon Bay (Kai Yip Estate)

Minibuses
 25 to Causeway Bay Paterson Street
 49M to Tin Hau station

Pedestrian escalator system 
The Hong Kong Government has proposed building a pedestrian link and escalator system between Braemar Hill and Fortress Hill, which has an MTR station. It would be the second such system in Hong Kong, after the Central–Mid-Levels escalator.

Nearby hills
Mount Parker
Jardine's Lookout

References

 
Eastern District, Hong Kong
Restricted areas of Hong Kong red public minibus